The 2022–23 Saint Peter's Peacocks men's basketball team represented Saint Peter's University in the 2022–23 NCAA Division I men's basketball season. The Peacocks, led by first-year head coach Bashir Mason, played their home games at the Run Baby Run Arena in Jersey City, New Jersey, as members of the Metro Atlantic Athletic Conference.

Previous season
The Peacocks finished the 2021–22 season 22–12, 14–6 in MAAC play to finish in second place. They defeated Fairfield and Quinnipiac in the MAAC tournament to advance to the championship game. There they defeated Monmouth to win the tournament championship. As a result, they received the conference's automatic bid to the NCAA tournament, for the first time since 2011, as the No. 15 seed in the East region. The Peacocks defeated No. 2 seed Kentucky to become only the 10th No. 15 seed to upset a No. 2 seed in the tournament's history. They defeated Murray State to advance to the Sweet Sixteen, becoming only the third No. 15 seed and first MAAC team to make it to the second weekend. They defeated Purdue to advance to the Elite Eight becoming the first No. 15 seed to do so. In the Elite Eight, the Peacocks lost to 8th-seeded North Carolina. On April 5, Saint Peter's was ranked No. 24 nationally in the season's final Coaches' Poll.

On March 30, 2022, head coach and Seton Hall alum Shaheen Holloway left to take the head coaching position at his alma mater, where he previously was an assistant from 2010–18.  On April 12, Jersey City native Bashir Mason, who was the head coach for Wagner, was named Holloway's replacement.

Roster

Schedule and results

|-
!colspan=12 style=| Regular season

|-
!colspan=12 style=| MAAC tournament

Sources

References

Saint Peter's Peacocks men's basketball seasons
Saint Peter's Peacocks
Saint Peter's Peacocks basketball
Saint Peter's Peacocks basketball